Tatsuo Kinoshita (木下 達生, born November 28, 1987) is a Japanese former professional baseball pitcher in Nippon Professional Baseball. He played for the Hokkaido Nippon-Ham Fighters in 2006 and 2007 and the Chunichi Dragons in 2011.

External links

NPB stats

1987 births
Living people
Baseball people from Nagoya
Japanese baseball players
Hokkaido Nippon-Ham Fighters players
Chunichi Dragons players